Lenka Oulehlová (born 14 June 1973, Brno, Czechoslovakia) is a retired Czech rhythmic gymnast.

She competed in the rhythmic gymnastics all-around competition at three Olympic Games: in 1988 in Seoul, in 1992 in Barcelona, and in 1996 in Atlanta. In 1988 and 1992 she represented Czechoslovakia, in 1996 Czech Republic. The only time she advanced to the final was in 1992 when she placed 8th in the qualifying round and then 8th overall. In 1988 she tied for 22nd place in the qualifying round and didn't advance to the final. In 1996 she placed 22nd in the qualifying round and didn't advance to the semifinal.

References

External links 
 Lenka Oulehlová at Sports-Reference.com

1973 births
Living people
Czech rhythmic gymnasts
Czechoslovak rhythmic gymnasts
Gymnasts at the 1988 Summer Olympics
Gymnasts at the 1992 Summer Olympics
Gymnasts at the 1996 Summer Olympics
Olympic gymnasts of Czechoslovakia
Olympic gymnasts of the Czech Republic
Sportspeople from Brno